Miropotes is a genus of braconid wasps in the family Braconidae. There are about 15 described species in Miropotes, found in Australasia and southeast Asia.

Species
These 15 species belong to the genus Miropotes:

 Miropotes austini Fernández-Triana & Whitfield, 2014
 Miropotes boothis Austin, 1990
 Miropotes burringbaris Austin, 1990
 Miropotes cadgeis Austin, 1990
 Miropotes chookolis Austin, 1990
 Miropotes creon Nixon, 1965
 Miropotes goobitis Austin, 1990
 Miropotes inexpectatus van Achterberg & Fernandez-Triana, 2017
 Miropotes katois Austin, 1990
 Miropotes kilkulunis Austin, 1990
 Miropotes lordhowensis Fernández-Triana & Whitfield, 2014
 Miropotes neglectus Fernández-Triana & Whitfield, 2014
 Miropotes orientalis Fernández-Triana & van Achterberg, 2014
 Miropotes petiolaris (Szépligeti, 1905)
 Miropotes thuraris Austin, 1990

References

Microgastrinae